Ceratophyllidia is a genus of sea slugs, dorid nudibranchs, shell-less marine gastropod molluscs in the family Phyllidiidae.

They are known for their unusually soft, spherical and stalked tubercules on their upper dorsa. Unlike the species of Phyllidia, they lack oral glands or the glands are free from the oral tube.

Species
Species in the genus Ceratophyllidia include:
 Ceratophyllidia africana Eliot, 1903
 Ceratophyllidia papilligera (Bergh, 1890)
Species brought into synonymy
 Ceratophyllidia grisea Eliot, 1910: synonym of Ceratophyllidia africana Eliot, 1903
 Ceratophyllidia molaensis (Meyer, 1977): synonym of Phyllidiella molaensis (Meyer, 1977)

References

Phyllidiidae
Gastropod genera